Paired box protein Pax-7 is a protein that in humans is encoded by the PAX7 gene.

Function 
Pax-7 plays a role in neural crest development and gastrulation, and it is an important factor in the expression of neural crest markers such as Slug, Sox9, Sox10 and HNK-1. PAX7 is expressed in the palatal shelf of the maxilla, Meckel's cartilage, mesencephalon, nasal cavity, nasal epithelium, nasal capsule and pons.

Pax7 is a transcription factor that plays a role in myogenesis through regulation of muscle precursor cells proliferation. It can bind to DNA as an heterodimer with PAX3. Also interacts with PAXBP1; the interaction links PAX7 to a WDR5-containing histone methyltransferase complex By similarity. Interacts with DAXX too.

PAX7 functions as a marker for a rare subset of spermatogonial stem cells, specifically a sub set of Asingle spermatogonia. These PAX7+ spermatogonia are rare in adult testis but are much more prevalent in newborns, making up 28% of germ cells in neonate testis. Unlike PAX7+ muscle satellite cells, PAX7+ spermatogonia rapidly proliferate and are not quiescent. PAX7+ spermatogonia are able to give rise to all stages of spermatogenesis and produce motile sperm. However, PAX7 is not required for spermatogenesis, as mice without PAX7+ spermatogonia show no deficits in fertility.

PAX7 may also function in the recovery in spermatogenesis. Unlike other spermatogonia, PAX7+ spermatogonia are resistant to radiation and chemotherapy. The surviving PAX7+ spermatogonia are able to increase in number following these therapies and differentiate into the other forms of spermatogonia that did not survive. Additionally, mice lacking PAX7 had delayed recovery of spermatogenesis following exposure to busulfan when compared to control mice.

Clinical significance 
Pax proteins play critical roles during fetal development and cancer growth. The specific function of the paired box gene 7 is unknown but speculated to involve tumor suppression since fusion of this gene with a forkhead domain family member has been associated with alveolar rhabdomyosarcoma.  Alternative splicing in this gene has produced two known products but the biological significance of the variants is unknown. Animal studies show that mutant mice have malformation of maxilla and the nose.

See also 
 Pax genes

References

Further reading

External links 
 
 
 

Transcription factors